Har Brakha (lit. Har Brakha is named after one of the two mountains that are mentioned in Deuteronomy on which half of the twelve tribes of Israel ascended in order to pronounce blessings, and shares the Mount Gerizim ridge with Kiryat Luza, the main Samaritan village. It is organised as a community settlement and falls under the jurisdiction of Shomron Regional Council.

The rabbi of Har Bracha and the Har Bracha Yeshiva is Rabbi Eliezer Melamed, author of the Peninei Halakha book series.

The international community considers Israeli settlements in the West Bank illegal under international law. The Israeli government disputes this.

The land of Har Brakha was confiscated by the Israelis from three nearby Palestinian villages: mostly from Burin, but also from Kafr Qallil and Iraq Burin.

History
Har Brakha was first established as a pioneer Nahal military outpost, and demilitarized when turned over to residential purposes on Yom Ha'atzmaut in 1983. The rapid expansion of the village is universally attributed to the  Yeshivat Har Brakha, which was built in 1991 as well as its rosh yeshiva, Rabbi Eliezer Melamed, who is also the chief rabbi of Har Brakha. While the vast majority of students (about 150 annually) are not originally from settlements, many graduates of the yeshiva return to live on the settlement.

Evangelical Christians from the United States have joined the community, with the support of Rabbi Melamed,  and their presence has aroused some controversy among residents.

Neighborhoods

After the construction of several hundred private houses on Har Bracha, the members of the settlement decided to start building four-story, five-story and six-story buildings.
This decision was made in order to lower the prices of apartments and give the opportunity for young couples to buy houses in the village. As part of the construction, a boys school and a girls school were also established in Har Bracha, together with eleven kindergartens.

References

External links
Har Brakha profile Shechem
Pictures of Har Brakha by Menachem Brody
A winning economic formula Israel Hayom, September 20, 2012

Nahal settlements
Religious Israeli settlements
Populated places established in 1983
1983 establishments in the Palestinian territories